The 2015 European Youth Olympic Winter Festival was held in Vorarlberg, Austria and Liechtenstein between 25 and 30 January 2015. It was the first time that two countries become hosts in a European Youth Olympic Festival.

Sports

Mascot
Alpy the marmot is the mascot for 2015 European Youth Olympic Winter Festival.

Venues
The venues are divided between places in the Vorarlberg region of Austria and in Liechtenstein.
Venues in Austria:

Venues in Liechtenstein:

Schedule
The competition schedule for the 2015 European Youth Olympic Winter Festival is as follows:

Opening ceremony
The opening ceremony for 2015 European Youth Olympic Winter Festival took place on 25 January in Montafon Nordic Sportszentrum in Tschagguns, Austria. Featuring about 150 amateur performers, the show focused about the close relation between the two co-hosts. The ceremony started with the parade of athletes from 45 countries, with the team from Austria and Liechtenstein marched together at the end of the parade. Carmen Wyler (Liechtenstein) and Thomas Pegram (Austria) then sang the national anthems of the hosts. After the speeches from ÖOC Secretary General Peter Mennel and EOC President Patrick Hickey, the Games were officially opened together by Heinz Fischer, President of Austria and Alois, Hereditary Prince of Liechtenstein. Then, Xaver Kuster, an Austrian snowboarder took the athletes' oath, followed by Marion Vettori for the judges' oath and Ralf Jegler (alpine skiing coach of Liechtenstein) for the coaches' oath.

Medal table
Russia topped the medal standings with 6 golds, 6 silvers, and four bronzes. Meanwhile, Germany had the highest medal count with 20.

References

External links
Final Report Book eyof2015.org (archived)

 
European Youth Olympic Winter Festival
European Youth Olympic Winter Festival
European Youth Olympic Winter Festival
European Youth Olympic Winter Festival
European Youth Olympic Winter Festival
International sports competitions hosted by Austria
International sports competitions hosted by Liechtenstein
Sport in Vorarlberg
Youth sport in Austria
Youth sport in Liechtenstein
Sports festivals in Austria
2015 in youth sport
January 2015 sports events in Europe